Sebastian Zalepa (born 7 February 1990 in Łódź) is a Polish professional footballer who plays as a centre-back for IV liga club Orkan Buczek.

Career

Club
He made his Ekstraklasa debut on 15 May 2011.

In July 2011, he was loaned to Tur Turek.

International
He was a part of Poland national under-21 football team.

References

External links
 
 

1990 births
Living people
Polish footballers
Poland youth international footballers
Poland under-21 international footballers
Widzew Łódź players
Flota Świnoujście players
Olimpia Grudziądz players
UKS SMS Łódź players
Tur Turek players
Stal Mielec players
Stal Stalowa Wola players
Wigry Suwałki players
Resovia (football) players
GKS Bełchatów players
Hutnik Nowa Huta players
Ekstraklasa players
I liga players
II liga players
Footballers from Łódź
Association football defenders